Hayley Green is a suburb of Halesowen in the Metropolitan Borough of Dudley, West Midlands, England, located to the south-west of Halesowen town centre. Its focal points are the Fox Hunt  public house run by the Harvester restaurant chain and a row of small shops on the A456/B4183 roundabout. It has mainly owner-occupied housing stock, including the Causey Farm estate, St Kenelms Avenue and Squirrels estate, with a small 1940s municipal housing estate off Uffmoor Lane.

The population for the appropriate Dudley ward (Hayley Green and Cradley South), taken at the 2011 census was 11,862.

The busy A456 Manor Way/Hagley Road is its main road, to the south of which is mostly green belt countryside mainly agricultural land next to the Clent Hills and the  Uffmoor Wood, an ancient woodland with public access.

Hayley Green is located on the West Midlands/Worcestershire border, with Hagley at the eastern end of the A456. Hagley Golf and Country Club borders the suburb. The area is largely within the ancient township of Lutley, which was a distantly detached part of the manor of the Deanery of Wolverhampton.

The area is served by Lutley Primary School. It is served by bus routes 192 and 4H.

Rock singer Robert Plant lived in the area as a teenager during the early 1960s.

References

Areas of Dudley
Halesowen